Supella is a genus of cosmopolitan and wild cockroaches, in the family Ectobiidae: originating from Africa and the Arabian Peninsula.

Species
The Cockroach Species File lists:
 sub-genus Supella (Mombuttia) Rehn, 1947
 Supella (Mombuttia) chapini Rehn, 1947
 sub-genus Supella (Nemosupella) Rehn, 1947
 Supella (Nemosupella) gemma Rehn, 1947
 Supella (Nemosupella) mirabilis (Shelford, 1908)
 Supella (Nemosupella) occidentalis Princis, 1963
 Supella (Nemosupella) tchadiana (Roth, 1987)
 sub-genus Supella (Supella) Shelford, 1911
 Supella (Supella) abbotti Rehn, 1947
 Supella (Supella) dimidiata (Gerstaecker, 1869)
 Supella (Supella) longipalpa (Fabricius, 1798)- type species (as Blatta supellectilium Serville; another synonym is S. supellectilium)
 Supella (Supella) orientalis Grandcolas, 1994
 Supella (Supella) vicina Chopard, 1958

References

External links
 
 

Cockroaches
Cockroach genera
Taxa named by Robert Walter Campbell Shelford